Kadayanallur is the largest city in Tenkasi district, Tamil Nadu, India. Kadayanallur is 17 km from Tenkasi.

Etymology 
The name Kadaiyanallur comes from "Kadaikaaleeswara", the name of the presiding deity of Kadayaleeswarar kovil, a Hindu temple in Kadayanallur.

Location 
The Town is situated about 18 km on north of Courtallam. Surrounded by the Western Ghats, Kadayanallur has scenic surroundings with paddy fields and ponds.

Geography
The town is on the foot of the Western Ghat and has an average elevation of .The town is surrounded by the western ghats in three sides and is situated on the way from Madurai to Kollam highway

The City is surrounded by paddy fields, coconut farms, and many ponds. A small river flows in the middle of the city. There are some rocky regions on the western end of the city called locally as 'parumbu'. Attakulam, Paloorani, Thamaraikulam, Annamalai peri and paatiyuthukulam and last and largest of those is Periyakulam are the ponds found in this city.

The City has an area of 52.25 sq.km. It is about 16 km to the north of Tenkasi and 47 km to the south of Rajapalayam. The N.H. 208 Quilon – Thirumangalam passes through this City. It in general has a dry climate except during the monsoon.

Climate 

Kadaiyanallur's climate is classified as tropical. The summers here have a good deal of rainfall, while the winters have very little. According to Köppen and Geiger, this climate is classified as Aw. The average annual temperature is 27.3 °C in Kadaiyanallur. The average annual rainfall is 1206 mm. The South West Monsoon brings in the cold breeze with mild temperature. From October to December North East Monsoon sets over in Tamil Nadu and the climate is cold and the rains are very heavy sometimes.

Demographics

According to the 2011 census, Kadaiyanallur Municipality had a population of 90,364 with a sex-ratio of 988 females for every 1,000 males, much above the national average of 929. A total of 9,810 were under the age of six, constituting 4,889 males and 4,921 females. Scheduled Castes and Scheduled Tribes accounted for 13.64% and 0.42% of the population respectively. The average literacy was 71.8%, compared to the national average of 72.99%.

The town had 21076 households. There were 34,039 workers, comprising 927 cultivators, 6,839 main agricultural labourers, 3,176 in household industries, 20,095 other workers, 3,002 marginal workers, 34 marginal cultivators, 390 marginal agricultural labourers, 569 marginal workers in household industries, and 2,009 other marginal workers.

As per the religious census of 2011, Kadaiyanallur had 35.98%, hindus, 63.42%, Muslims, 0.48% Christians, 0.01% Buddhists and 0.1% following other religions.

Government and Politics

Amenities

The Indian Postal Service Pincode is 627751 (Bazaar), 627759 (Krishnapuram). The Telecom Code (BSNL) is 04633.

Economy
Make the textile industry of the last generation of people and send it to neighboring countries,
It is famous for saaral (drizzling), which occurs from May to August. It is known for its vast paddy and coconut fields.

Most of the last generation of residents were farmers and Weavers; however, many are now employed around India and in countries such as the Middle East, Singapore.Malaysia.

Most recently kadayanalur got people attraction for the gold business. You can find full street with jewel shops with affordable prices.

People Regularly Visits around the area such as Dam, Water Falls and Agricultural area.

Cityscape

Tourism
The main tourist attractions of the city are karuppanadhi dam,kallaru river,periyaru river,arulmigu abhayagastha anjaneyar temple,kadakaleeshwarar temple,kookaruvi falls at the top of hills,kannimariyamman temple Krishnan kovil, Bathrakaliamman kovil ,Mavadickal Shri Bathrakaliamman Kovil kariya manika perumal kovil.

Transport

By Rail 
Kadayanallur Railway station is situated in Kadayanallur, Tamil Nadu. Station code of Kadayanallur is KDNL. Here are some trains that are passing through Kadayanallur railway station like Ms-sct Pothigai Exp, Pothigai Exp, Ms-sct Silambu Bi-wkly, Sct-ms Silambu Bi-wkly, Tbm-sct Special Fare, Sct-mdu Pass., Mdu-sct Pass., and many more.

By Bus
SETC Bus Service is available from the Kadayanallur New Bus Stand to all major locations in Tamil Nadu. All Major Private Omni Bus have daily services connecting kadayanallur and Chennai,Bangalore.

By Air
The nearest airports are as follows:-

 Tuticorin Airport (101 km or 66 miles)
 Trivandrum International Airport (123 km or 76 miles)
 Madurai Airport (141 km or 87 miles)
 Cochin International Airport (258 Km)
 Chennai Airport (600 Km)

References 

 

Cities and towns in Tirunelveli district